Perm-36 (also known as ITK-6) was a Soviet forced labor colony located near the village of Kuchino, 100 km (60 miles) northeast of the city of Perm in Russia. It was part of the large prison camp system established by the former Soviet Union during the Stalin era, known as the Gulag. Since 1972 the camp was designated a "strict regime" and "special regime" (строгого режима, особого режима) camp used exclusively for the incarceration of "especially dangerous state criminals", mostly Soviet dissidents.

Built in 1946 and closed in December 1987, the camp was preserved in 1994 by the  Russian human historical and human rights organization Memorial. In 1995 the following year it was opened to the public as The "Perm-36" Museum of the History of Political Repression (known popularly as the Gulag Museum). It was run by an NGO called the Perm-36 Memorial Center of Political Repression".  It was the only surviving example of a Gulag labor camp, the others having been abandoned or demolished by the Soviet government before the dissolution of the Soviet Union.

The museum was a founding member of the International Coalition of Historic Sites of Conscience. and received an average 35,000 visitors a year. There were hopes that the museum might be incorporated as a UNESCO World Heritage Site. In 2004, however, the World Monuments Fund included Perm 36 in its Watchlist of 100 Most Endangered Sites.

Later various bodies of Perm Region administration withdrew support and funding, forcing the museum to close in April 2014.

Perm-36 in the Soviet period
From the "Perm-36" Museum English brochure:
The "Perm-36" camp operated for more than 40 years. It was founded in 1943. In 1946 it was transferred to its current location. Till 1953 it served as a typical logging camp found throughout the country. After Stalin‘s death, the camp was converted to house officials of the repressive organs accused of "groundless repressive measures" under the Stalinist regime. In 1972 the camp was converted into the harshest political camp of the country and operated till it closed in 1988. It included a "special-regime " facility, the only one of its kind in the USSR, to house political prisoners in twenty-four-hour closed cells. They HAD continued their struggle against the regime and its ideology after their first prison terms and were considered to be "especially dangerous" by the State. All of them, as a rule, were sentenced to 10 years.

Groups and individuals in the Perm camps were described in a 1974 report published by the samizdat periodical A Chronicle of Current Events. After an introduction to the camps, and a description of some of those held in Perm-35 the report turned to 95 prisoners in Perm-36. It listed them in eight groups arrested and imprisoned for a variety of crimes: [1] samizdat offences, protests and petitions, e.g. Semyon Gluzman (7 years, plus 3 years exile); [2] belonging to "anti-Soviet organisations", e.g. Ivan Kandyba (years); [3] Zionists, e.g. some of those given sentences of 10-12 years for their part in the 1970 Hijackers Trial and the 1971 "Aeroplane Affair" in Leningrad; [4] Persons attempting to leave the USSR; [5] Ukrainian nationalists "and those ruled to be such", e.g. Vasyl Stus (5 years, plus 3 years exile); [6] the Lithuanian national movement, e.g. Juozas Jucis (12 years), and seven who were serving a 25-year term; [7] War criminals; and [8] those convicted of "especially dangerous crimes against the State", e.g. Georgian poet Teimuraz Chanturishvili (12 years). The most serious "dissident" offence between 1960 and 1987 was anti-Soviet agitation (Article 70). It was included in the post-Stalin RSFSR Criminal Code (1960) among  "Especially Dangerous Crimes against the State", i.e. treason, contraband, etc.

During two and a half decades, since the end of the 1920s and till the day of Stalin‘s death, GULAG [official abbreviation for "Main Administration of Camps"] was not only a huge camp agency containing thousands of camps and millions of convicts, but the country‘s way of life. GULAG was an absolutely necessary element of the system. Without the GULAG cheap slave labour, Stalin‘s socialist modernization programme of the country‘s economy would have been impossible. Without the total fear in the face of the horrors of repression and camps, the totalitarian regime and strict discipline and total subjection for those "at liberty" would have also been impossible. After the death of Stalin the number of camps in the USSR decreased, but the communist political system remained repressive till its collapse. In 1960-80s thousands of dissidents were placed in prisons, political camps, mental hospitals.

"Perm-36" Memorial Museum is the only preserved саmр of the GULAG еrа throughout the former USSR. The museum presents all the periods of the repressive роliсу and the USSR penitentiary system history starting from the first years of Soviet power and the GULAG to the ending of political camps and political prisoners on the еvе of the communist system collapse. Exposition, exhibition, and authentic саmр interiors are placed in different саmр buildings and structures, the latter were constructed and reconstructed during 1946-80. 
The museum finds, collects, and studies various materials on the history of political repression. The museum's exhibitions are displayed in different regions of Russia and abroad.

The Museum is located near the village of Kuchino, Chusovoy district, Perm region.

The "Pilorama" forum

From 2005 onwards there was an annual international forum at Perm-36, called "Pilorama" ("The Sawmill" (more precisely "Power-saw bench") :ru:Пилорама (форум), with meetings It brought together famous people, film screenings, exhibitions and concerts and attracted thousands of people, including former prisoners and human rights activists, including the Human Rights Commissioner in Russia Vladimir Lukin. 

The "Sawmill" was not popular with everyone. It was criticized and attacked by former prison guards of Perm-36 and some of the social movements of Stalinist focus. They argued that the forum organizers deliberately exaggerated the severity of custody "for anti-Soviet propaganda", while ignoring, as they said, prison records and evidence of the guards themselves.

Takeover

In autumn 2013 an autonomous NGO calling itself the "Perm-36 Memorial Museum of the History of Political Repression" was granted the status of a federal NGO and the museum was included in a list of Russia's "National Sites of Remembrance". The next year a State-funded museum with a similar name was created and gradually began to take over the management of the Perm-36 museum.

Coming at a period of nostalgia for the Soviet Union in Russia and patriotism due to the Crimean crisis, these changes were seen by many as an organized campaign against the original museum "of political repression". Official Russian media and some nationalist organisations (e.g. the Sut' Vremeni) began describing the museum established in 1995 as a fifth column.

The NGO eventually disbanded after repeated arguments with Perm-36 officials. The museum and its exhibits were refurbished to remove references to Stalin.

Links 
Perm-36 Official website (in Russian)
A Chronicle of Current Events, 1968-1982.

References

Political repression in the Soviet Union
Camps of the Gulag
Open-air museums in Russia
Museums in Perm Krai
Non-profit organizations listed in Russia as foreign agents
Prison museums in Russia